The current form of the national flag of the Slovak Republic was adopted by Slovakia's Constitution, which came into force on 3 September 1992. The flag, like many other flags of Slavic nations, uses Pan-Slavic colors (red, white, and blue). Pictured in the centre of the flag is Slovakia's national coat of arms.

History
Slovakia's flag in its current form (but with another coat of arms on it or without any arms) can be dated back to the revolutionary year 1848. It was also used semi-officially in Czechoslovakia before World War II, by the Slovak Republic during World War II.

In 1990, the interior ministry tasked Ladislav Čisárik, a painter and heraldic artist, and Ladislav Vrtel, an expert in heraldry, with creating a new coat of arms and national flag. Čisárik and Vrtel based their designs for a modern coat of arms and flag on an existing 14th century coat of arms. However, Čisárik and Vrtel chose to enlarge the double cross three times to emphasize it as a national symbol. In addition to the national coat of arms and the national flag, the duo also designed a new presidential standard, which incorporates the double cross as well.

The new flag was finally adopted (initially without Čisárik's and Vrtel's coat of arms) on 1 March 1990 as the flag of the Slovak Republic within Czechoslovakia. The coat of arms was added on 3 September 1992 and a special law describing the details of the flag followed in February 1993, after Slovakia became an independent country.

Design

Since the Slovak flag without the coat of arms is identical to the current flag of the Russian Federation, and can also be compared to the modern flag of Slovenia, the Constitution of Slovakia added the national coat of arms to it in September 1992.

It is one of 28 national flags that contain overtly Christian symbols.

Photo gallery

Presidential standard

Historical flags

See also

Coat of arms of Slovakia
Pan-Slavic colors

References

External links 

 Slovakia Flag
 Zákon NR SR o štátnych symboloch Slovenskej republiky a ich používaní
 
 

Flags of Slovakia
Flags with crosses
Flags introduced in 1992
Flag
National flags